SAS Spear (pennant number: S97), initially known as the SAS Maria van Riebeeck, was a  of the South African Navy (SAN). Built in France during the 1960s, the boat was the SAN's first submarine. It was scrapped in June–July 2003.

Description
The submarine displaced  surfaced and  submerged. For surface running, the boat was powered by two SEMT Pielstick  diesel engines, each driving a single propeller shaft. When submerged each propeller was driven by a  electric motor. Spear could reach  on the surface and  underwater. It was armed with a dozen  torpedo tubes, eight in the bow and four in the stern. Spear had a complement of 6 officers and 41 ratings.

Construction and career
The boat was laid down at the Nantes shipyard of Dubigeon-Normandie on 14 March 1968, launched on 18 March 1969 and commissioned on 22 June 1970.

On 20 August 1970, Maria van Riebeeck collided with the French submarine  (also a member of the Daphné class) off Toulon. Both submarines were badly damaged, with Galatée being forced to run aground to avoid sinking.

The boat received an upgraded sonar and electronics during a mid-life update that was completed in 1992. Spear was scrapped in Simon's Town by SA Metal and Machinery Co. (Pty) Ltd. during June–July 2003.

Citations

References

Further reading
 

Submarines of the South African Navy
Ships built in France
1969 ships
Daphné-class submarines of the South African Navy
Ships built by Chantiers Dubigeon